Paida is a monotypic moth genus of the family Noctuidae erected by Karl Jordan in 1896. Its only species, Paida pulchra, was first described by Roland Trimen in 1863. It is found in South Africa, Namibia and Zimbabwe.

References

Noctuidae
Monotypic moth genera